Victor Richard Ellena (born 15 January 1951 in Christchurch) is a New Zealand Anglican bishop. He was the Bishop of the Anglican Diocese of Nelson between 3 February 2007 and his retirement at the end of 2018.

He was educated at the University of Canterbury after which he worked as a teacher until studying for the Priesthood. He was ordained an Anglican priest in 1985 and has held incumbencies at Kensington-Otipua, Blenheim and Marlborough, where he was also the area's Archdeacon.

He was consecrated bishop of the Diocese of Nelson at 3 February 2007. An Evangelical Anglican, he is a supporter of the Anglican realignment, having attended the Global South Fourth Encounter, in Singapore, at 19–23 April 2010, and the GAFCON II, in Nairobi, Kenya, at 21–26 October 2013.

References

1961 births
Living people
21st-century Anglican bishops in New Zealand
Evangelical Anglican bishops
People from Christchurch
Anglican archdeacons in New Zealand
Anglican bishops of Nelson